Life Regiment Grenadiers, also I 3, was a Swedish Army infantry unit that was active in various forms 1815–2000. The unit was based in Örebro Garrison in Örebro and belonged to the King's Life and Household Troops (Kungl. Maj:ts Liv- och Hustrupper) until 1974.

History
The unit has its root in the Life Regiment Grenadier Corps (Livregementets grenadjärkår), which at the division of the Life Regiments (in 1791) was called the Life Regiment Brigade's Light Infantry Battalion (Livregementsbrigadens lätta infanteribataljon), but which in 1804 adopted the name Life Regiment Grenadier Corps. Its strength then amounted to foura companies with 500 men, divided into Stockholm County, Södermanland County, Västmanland County and Örebro County. Its training area was located at Utnäs löt, near Strömsholm, and the unit was mainly based in Västerås. In 1893, the corps was amalgamated into the Life Regiment of Foot (Livregementet till fot) which was created a merger of Life Regiment Grenadier Corps and Närke Regiment. On 8 December 1904, the Life Regiment of Foot changed its name to the Life Regiment Grenadiers. Through vacancy, the regiment was set at 1,000 men. It later (1912) received its conscript from Örebro and to some extent from Värmland County. Its training area was Sannahed, near Hallsberg railway station, and the unit was based in Örebro, where it was later relocated.

Locations and training areas

Barracks
During the period that the regiment had its military camp at Utnäslöt, there was an office in Västerås. When the Life Regiment Grenadier Corps and Närke Regiment were amalgamated in 1893 and formed the Life Regiment of Foot, the greater part of the Life Regiment Grenadier Corps was transferred to Sannahed. From 1 October 1904, the regiment moved its office to Örebro, where it took over the former chancery building of the Life Regiment Hussars. In 1913, the regiment left its military camp at Sannahed and moved into the barracks in Örebro on 2 March. In Örebro, three barracks had been erected in connection with the neighborhood of Rynninge. The barracks were later (1958) named after three of the major victories of the Life Regiment Grenadier Corps and Närke-Värmland Regiment, respectively. Barracks 1 was named after Lund, Barracks 2 was named after Narva and Barracks 3 was named after Kliszów. The barracks along with the chancery building framed a large barracks yard in classic regiment architecture signed Viktor Bodin. Plans were in place to add a fourth barracks and with it form an open square around the barracks yard. The barracks establishment was erected after the 1901 Army Program following the Barracks Building Board's (Kasernbyggnadsnämnden) first series of type drawings. In total, some 80 buildings were erected in the area. In connection with the barracks yard, the Swedish Missionary Society, through the association Soldaternas vänner i Örebro län ("Friends of the Soldiers in Örebro County") erected a so-called soldathem ("soldier's home") on Höglundagatan 2.

After the conscription training ended in the summer of 1992, the barracks yard was divided into an older and a younger section. The older southwest part of the barracks, among other things, was sold to Örebro Municipality. The younger northeast part consisting of, among other things, a hospital building, vehicle area, workshops and storage areas remained as a military area until 1999. Originally it was intended that the regimental staff would be grouped in the former hospital building. However, the staff remained in the chancery building and the Home Guard and volunteer sections of the regiment in their building in the southwest part. These two buildings were leased until the regiment was disbanded. After the Swedish Armed Forces left the northeast area in 2002, the area was developed into the neighborhood of Grenadjärstaden.

Training areas
When the Life Regiment was divided, the Life Regiment Grenadier Corps from 1780 came to have its military camp and training area at Utnäslöt just over 3 km northeast of Strömsholm Palace. The camp was left in 1894 (the last exercises were held there in 1893), but the place was maintained until 1902 as a remount depot. When the Life Regiment Grenadier Corps and Närke Regiment were amalgamated and formed the Life Regiment of Foot, Närke Regiment's military camp was taken over at Sannahed. There the regiment trained until 1912, after which the operations were transferred to Örebro. Sannahed came during World War II to act as a training area for the Landstormen as well as parts of the regiment's units that did not fit in Örebro.

In 1944, the regiment added a new training area, Villingsberg, in Kilsbergen. The area was shared with the newly established Bergslagen Artillery Regiment (A 9)..

Heraldry and traditions

Colours, standards and guidons
The colour of the Life Regiment Grenadiers is drawn by Brita Grep and embroidered by hand in insertion technique by the company Libraria. The colour was presented to the regiment by His Majesty the King Gustaf VI Adolf on 12 December 1956. It was used as regimental colour by I 3/Fo 51 until 1 July 2000. Blazon: "On white cloth in the centre the Royal Swedish coat of arms as to the law without mantle. In each corner three yellow open crowns placed two and one. Battle honours (Lützen 1632, Oldendorf 1633, Wittstock 1636, Leipzig 1642, Warsaw 1656, Frederiksodde 1657, Tåget över Bält 1658, Lund 1676, Landskrona 1677, Narva 1700, Düna 1701, Kliszów 1702, Fraustadt 1706, Holowczyn 1708, Malatitze 1708, Hälsingborg 1710, Gadebusch 1712, Svensksund 1790) in yellow horizontally placed around the coat of arms."

Coat of arms
The coat of arms of the unit was used from 1977 to 2000. Blazon: "Azure, the lesser coat of arms of Sweden, three open crowns or placed two and one. The shield surmounted two muskets in saltire and is surrounded by a roundel of straw placed under muskets and crown, all or."

Medals
In 1937, the Örebro försvarsområdes och Livregementets grenadjärers förtjänstmedalj ("Örebro Defence District and Life Regiment Grenadiers Medal of Merit") in gold, silver and bronze (Fo51/I3GM/SM/BM) of the 8th size was established. In 1991, it was renamed Livregementets grenadjärers (I 3) förtjänstmedalj ("Life Regiment Grenadiers (I 3) Medal of Merit") in gold, silver and bronze (LivreggrenGM/SM/BM). The medal ribbon is of white moiré with pale blue edges and a pale blue stripe on the middle.

In 2000, the Livregementets grenadjärers (I 3) minnesmedalj ("Life Regiment Grenadiers (I 3) Commemorative Medal") in silver (LivreggrenSMM) of the 8th size was established. The medal ribbon is of red moiré with a white stripe on the middle followed on both sides by a blue stripe.

Commanding officers
Executive officers (Sekundchefer) and regimental commanders from 1815 to 2000. Sekundchef was a title used until 31 December 1974 in the regiments that were included in the King's Life and Household Troops (Kungl. Maj:ts Liv- och Hustrupper). From 1791 to 1809 the Crown Prince was regimental commander. From 1818 to 1974 His Majesty the King was regimental commander. From 1975 to 2000, the monarch was honorary commander of the regiment. However, Åke Hultin retained the title of Sekundchef'' until his departure in 1977.

Executive officers

1815–1821: C U Ridderstolpe
1821–1853: J E af Wetterstedt
1853–1861: N H Hägerflycht
1861–1865: O M von Knorring
1865–1875: H M Falkenberg
1875–1879: O E F Flemming
1879–1881: A H Leijonhufvud
1881–1884: H O E d'Ailly
1884–1893: C G von Ehrenheim
1893–1897: J F Lilliehök
1897–1902: Carl Axel Mauritz Nordenskjöld
1902–1911: Hugo Jungstedt
1911–1917: Hans Ludvig von Dardel
1917–1922: Carl August Pontus Axelsson Sjögren
1922–1927: Hugo Oskar Herman Wikner 
1928–1931: Ernst Nils David af Sandeberg
1931–1936: Colonel Hugo Cederschiöld
1936–1937: Colonel Helge Jung
1936–1937: Lieutenant colonel Axel Gyllenkrok (acting)
1937–1942: Manne Brandel
1942–1947: Colonel Alf Meyerhöffer
1947–1949: Engelbrekt Flodström (acting)
1949–1952: Engelbrekt Flodström
1952–1955: Carl Fredrik Lemmel
1955–1963: Per Wollrath Sebastian H:son Tamm
1963–1963: Colonel Sten Wåhlin
1964–1966: Colonel Ove Ljung
1966–1972: Colonel Ebbe Gyllenstierna
1972–1974: Erik Åke Hultin

Regimental commanders

1815–1818: Crown Prince Charles John
1818–1844: Charles XIV John
1844–1859: Oscar I
1859–1872: Charles XV
1872–1905: Oscar II
1907–1950: Gustaf V
1950–1973: Gustaf VI Adolf
1973–1974: Carl XVI Gustaf
1975–1977: Åke Hultin
1977–1983: Senior colonel John Petersson
1983–1992: Einar Lyth
1992–1998: Hans Hacksell
1998–2000: Christer Svensson

Deputy regimental commanders
1979–1981: Colonel Jörn Beckmann

Names, designations and locations

See also
List of Swedish infantry regiments

Footnotes

References

Notes

Print

Further reading

Örebro Garrison
Infantry regiments of the Swedish Army
Disbanded units and formations of Sweden
Military units and formations established in 1815
Military units and formations disestablished in 2000